Sophronica sundukovi is a species of beetle in the family Cerambycidae. It was described by Mikhail Leontievich Danilevsky in 2009. It is known from North Korea and Russia.

References

Sophronica
Beetles described in 2009